Kajiyama is a Japanese surname. Notable people with the surname include:

, Japanese guitarist
Hiroshi Kajiyama (disambiguation), multiple people
, Japanese gymnast
, Japanese politician
, Japanese politician
, Japanese basketball coach
, Japanese yakuza member
, Japanese writer
, Japanese footballer
, Japanese footballer

Japanese-language surnames